Leonard Raymond Walterscheid (born September 13, 1954 in Gainesville, Texas) was an American football safety who played eight seasons in the National Football League for the Chicago Bears and the Buffalo Bills.

1954 births
Living people
People from Gainesville, Texas
American football safeties
Southern Utah Thunderbirds football players
Chicago Bears players
Buffalo Bills players